Lucien De Brauwere (10 June 1951 – 17 October 2020) was a Belgian cyclist. He competed in the individual road race at the 1972 Summer Olympics.

De Brauwere died on 17 October 2020 in Petegem-aan-de-Schelde, aged 69.

References

External links
 

1951 births
2020 deaths
Belgian male cyclists
Olympic cyclists of Belgium
Cyclists at the 1972 Summer Olympics
People from Oudenaarde
Cyclists from East Flanders